Horsham is a hamlet in Rural Municipality of Enterprise No. 142, Saskatchewan, Canada.

See also
 List of communities in Saskatchewan

References

Enterprise No. 142, Saskatchewan
Unincorporated communities in Saskatchewan